A sculpture garden or sculpture park is an outdoor garden or park which includes the presentation of sculpture, usually several permanently sited works in durable materials in landscaped surroundings.

A sculpture garden may be private, owned by a museum and accessible freely or for a fee, or public and accessible to all. Some cities own large numbers of public sculptures, some of which they may present together in city parks.

Exhibits range from individual, traditional sculptures to large site-specific installations. Sculpture gardens may also vary greatly in size and scope, either featuring the collected works of multiple artists, or the artwork of a single individual.  These installations are related to several similar concepts, most notably land art, where landscapes become the basis of a site-specific sculpture, and topiary gardens, which consists of clipping or training live plants into living sculptures.  A sculpture trail layout may be adopted, either in a park or through open countryside.  The Irwell Sculpture Trail, the largest public art scheme in England, includes 28 art pieces along a  footpath stretching from Salford Quays through Bury into Rossendale and up to the Pennines above Bacup.

History 
Sculpture gardens have a long history around the world – the oldest known collection of human constructions is a Neanderthal "sculpture garden" unearthed in Bruniquel Cave in France in 1990. Within the cave, broken stalagmites were arranged in a series of stacked or ring-like structures approximately 175,000 years ago.

Garden statues, often of very high quality, were a feature of ancient Roman gardens, revived at the Renaissance, and then especially a feature of the Baroque garden.  Palace gardens, such as the Gardens of Versailles, featured a concentration of sculpture equalling that of larger modern sculpture parks.

In the United States, the oldest public sculpture garden is a part of the joint park and wildlife preserve Brookgreen Gardens, located in South Carolina. The property was opened in 1932, and has since been included on the National Register of Historic Places.

See also
 List of garden types
 Garden of Cosmic Speculation
 Tarot Garden
 List of sculpture parks

References

Further reading
 Blázquez Abascal, Jimena; Valeria Varas; and Raúl Rispa. (2006). Sculpture Parks in Europe: A Guide to Art and Nature. Basel; Boston: Birkhäuser Architecture. 
 Cigola, Francesca. (2013). Art Parks: A Tour of America's Sculpture Parks and Gardens. New York: Princeton Architectural Press. 
 Harper, Glenn; and Twylene Moyer, eds. (2008). Landscapes for Art: Contemporary Sculpture Parks. Hamilton, NJ: ISC Press; and Seattle: University of Washington Press.

External links 
 

Garden
Types of art museums and galleries
Types of garden